Raffaele Colamonici was an Italian film producer and production manager.

Selected filmography
 Naples in Green and Blue (1935)
 The Last Dance (1941)
 A Husband for the Month of April (1941)
 The Queen of Navarre (1942)
 Totò Le Mokò (1949)
 The Gay Swordsman (1950)
 The Transporter (1950)
 Free Escape (1951)
 Abracadabra (1952)
 Red Love (1952)

References

Bibliography 
 Goble, Alan. The Complete Index to Literary Sources in Film. Walter de Gruyter, 1999.

External links 
 

Year of birth unknown
Year of death unknown
Italian film producers